"Undecided" is a song by American singer Chris Brown. It was released as a single on January 4, 2019, by RCA Records. The song serves as the lead single from Chris Brown's ninth studio album Indigo.

Composition and lyrics
The song was written by Chris Brown, Antonio Stith and Felicia Ferraro, and was produced by Scott Storch, that had previously worked with Brown for the singles "Run It!" and "Gimme That", working with him as well on his albums Exclusive and Heartbreak on a Full Moon. "Undecided" is a midtempo R&B and pop song that runs for three minutes and eight seconds, that contains a sample of American R&B singer Shanice's 1991 hit "I Love Your Smile".

Music video
On January 4, 2019, Brown uploaded the music video for "Undecided" on his YouTube account. The music video features Serayah as Brown's love interest.

Commercial performance
"Undecided" debuted at number 35 on the US Billboard Hot 100, serving as Chris Brown's 91st entry on the chart, tying James Brown's for eighth most Hot 100 entries all-time and is Brown’s first Hot 100 hit since "Freaky Friday" with Lil Dicky in April 2018, which peaked at number eight.

Charts

Weekly charts

Year-end charts

Certifications

Release history

References

2019 singles
Chris Brown songs
Song recordings produced by Scott Storch
Songs written by Chris Brown
2019 songs
Songs written by Scott Storch
Songs written by Narada Michael Walden